Drevin is a surname. Notable people with the surname include:

Aleksandr Drevin (1889–1938), Latvian-Russian painter
Andrey Drevin (1921–1996), Russian sculptor, son of Aleksandr
Dmitri Drevin (born 1982), Russian gymnast

See also
Drevin, French village in the commune of Saint-Pierre-de-Varennes